This article lists events that occurred during 1971 in Estonia.

Incumbents

Events
Lahemaa National Park was established.

Births
16 November – Annely Peebo, Estonian mezzo-soprano and host of Eurovision Song Contest 2002

Deaths

References

 
1970s in Estonia
Estonia
Estonia
Years of the 20th century in Estonia